HMS Arethusa was a 50-gun fourth-rate sailing frigate of the Royal Navy launched in 1849 from the Pembroke Dockyard. The fourth naval ship to bear the name, she served in the Crimean War and then in 1861 was converted to a steam screw frigate.  Decommissioned in 1874, Arethusa became a school and training ship on the River Thames, preparing young boys for maritime careers, until she was broken up in 1934.

Construction
HMS Arethusa was ordered in 1844 from the Pembroke Dockyard as a repeat of the frigate HMS Constance and was launched on 26 June 1849. She had a tonnage of 2,132 and was designed with a V-shaped hull by Sir William Symonds. She was of all-wooden construction.

Naval service

Arethusa saw service during the Crimean War, On 29 October 1853, she ran aground in the Dardanelles. She was refloated the next day after her guns had been removed to lighten her. Arethusa took part in battles at Odessa and Sevastopol. At the time of the battle in 1854 she was captained by William Robert Mends and was the last major ship of the Royal Navy to enter an engagement under sail power alone.

In 1860-1861 Arethusa was lengthened and converted to screw propulsion at Chatham Dockyard, with a steam trunk engine made by John Penn and Sons, London.

Training ship
Once decommissioned, in 1874, the ship's engines were removed and she was loaned by the Admiralty to the charity that later became known as Shaftesbury Homes and Arethusa. Retaining the name Arethusa, she was moored next to their existing training ship Chichester at Greenhithe, Kent. Shaftesbury Homes provided refuge and taught maritime skills to destitute young boys who had been sleeping rough on the streets of London and trained them for a career in the Royal Navy or Merchant Navy.

In 1933 the wooden frigate was no longer viable, and was replaced by the steel-hulled ship Peking, which was moored at Upnor on the Medway, and renamed Arethusa. The frigate returned to the Admiralty, was sold to Castle's Shipbreakers on 2 August 1933 and demolished at Charlton, London in the following year. The frigate's figurehead, originally carved by the Hellyer family, was retained by the school and displayed onshore at Upnor, where it remains after restoration in 2013.

References

External links
 
 A short extract from Lieut Henry Rogers Journal while he was on HMS Arethusa
 A list of HMS Arethusa's crew who were killed and wounded during the bombardment of Sebastopol in 1854

Frigates of the Royal Navy
1849 ships
Ships built in Pembroke Dock
Training ships of the United Kingdom
Maritime incidents in October 1853